A circle contact lens, also known as a big eye contact lens and circle lens, is a cosmetic (non-corrective and decorative) contact lens that makes the eye's iris appear larger. It has become a trend throughout East, South and Southeast Asia and is largely produced in Japan, South Korea and China.

Design 
Circle lenses make one's eyes appear larger and come in a variety of colors and effects. They have been around since 2004 and are very popular in countries such as South Korea, Japan, Taiwan and China.

The diameter of regular contact lenses that are sold in the United States are on average 14mm–16mm. Similar to the diameter of regular contact lenses, circle lenses have no more than 15mm diameter since larger sizes would be harmful to the eyes at daily wear. When the diameter of the circle lens is described as 16mm or 18mm, it is only the provided visual effect of the circle lens. The difference between the two types of lenses is that circle lenses are tinted not only in areas that cover the iris of the eye, but also prominently in the extra-wide outer rim of the lens. The result is the appearance of a bigger, wider iris with a limbal ring, creating an illusion of large eyes.

The optical zone in the middle is transparent and it is large enough to provide clear vision. When big eye contacts first launched, they were only available in yearly disposable format, but as the trend spread, these lenses are now available as dailies, biweeklies and monthlies. The lenses are popular among teenagers and young adults. Many people consider circle lenses to be a fashion accessory rather than a medical device. In Hong Kong, many young female models wear them as popular fashion icons.

Popularity 
In Asia, circle contact lenses can be bought from many online stores and are imported from manufacturing countries such as South Korea to nations such as Thailand, China, Malaysia, Japan, Nepal, Sri Lanka, Singapore, Vietnam, and Taiwan. They can be purchased without a prescription (0.00 or plano) or with prescription. Their legality in the West varies with the local laws, and in the United States they are currently classified as a medical device and are not legal for sale without a valid prescription.

Risks 
A meta-analysis reported that cosmetically tinted lenses appear to be safe when properly prescribed by an eye care professional and when used correctly.

Decorative soft contact lens must be fitted appropriately, as tinted soft contact lenses may reduce vision by temporarily increasing the number of high-order aberrations under bright-light and low-light conditions, as the center of tinted lenses does not always coincide with the center of the cornea, and thus decorative soft contact lenses must be fitted appropriately. Indeed, concerns with these lenses in the United States arise from people buying lenses without consulting their optometrists, which could result in lenses that do not fit the individual's eyes properly.

Legality

United States
In the United States decorative, non-corrective contact lenses are considered medical devices by the Food and Drug Administration (FDA) and sale and marketing of such devices require market clearance by the FDA and a valid prescription from a medical professional. Devices that have not been cleared by the FDA may be subject to seizure by US Customs.

Korean contact lens companies Geo Medical Inc. and Migwang Contact Lens (operating under the brand name Clearlab in the US) have been approved by the FDA for sale in the United States. Circle lenses manufactured in Korea are under the approval and guidelines of the Ministry of Food and Drug Safety. Acuvue, an American subsidiary of Johnson & Johnson (J&J), has a line prescription of 1-Day circle lenses marketed under the name "Acuvue Define" available in Far East markets, online and now in the UK and US.

See also 
 Body modification

References 

Contact lenses
Asian culture
Human eye
Chinese fashion
Japanese fashion
South Korean fashion
Malaysian fashion
Singaporean fashion
Sri Lankan fashion
Taiwanese fashion
Thai fashion